Ingvar Ómarsson (born 13 April 1989) is an Icelandic professional racing cyclist. He is a multiple national champion in road cycling, cross country mountain biking, and cyclocross.

He was the first Icelandic native to become a full-time professional cyclist, he was also the first person to finish a mountain biking World Championship race for Iceland. In 2022 he was the first Icelander to finish a major road race championship in the Elite category, at the European Championships in Munchen. He specializes in cross-country mountain biking, and races both olympic cross-country (XCO) and marathon cross-country (XCM).

Ingvar was voted the Icelandic Cyclist of The Year for eight consecutive years from 2014 to 2021.

Major results

2012
 1st Cross-country, National Mountain Bike Championships
 3rd Blue Lagoon Challenge
 4th Þingvellir – Grimsnes

2013
 1st Road race, National Road Championships
 1st Vesturgatan
 2nd Cross-country, National Mountain Bike Championships
 2nd Reykjarnes Tournament
 3rd Alvogen Midnight Time Trial
 3rd Blue Lagoon Challenge

2014
 1st Cross-country, National Mountain Bike Championships
 National Road Championships
1st Road race
3rd Time trial
 1st Sea Otter Classic XCO
 1st WOW Cyclothon 4-man team
 1st Vesturgatan
 2nd Overall Landskeppni
1st Prologue & Stage 2
 2nd Krýsuvik Time Trial
 2nd Jökulmílan
 2nd Blue Lagoon Challenge

2015
 1st Cross-country, National Mountain Bike Championships
 1st National Cyclo-cross Championships
 1st Road race, National Road Championships
 1st Jökulmílan
 2nd Blue Lagoon Challenge

2016
 National Mountain Bike Championships
1st Cross-country
1st Cross-country marathon
 1st National Cyclo-cross Championships
 1st Open Haagsen Kampioenschappen
 3rd Blue Lagoon Challenge
 5th Kronborg UCI CX

2017
 National Mountain Bike Championships
1st Cross-country
1st Cross-country marathon
 1st WOW Cyclothon 10-man team
 2nd National Cyclo-cross Championships
 5th Road race, National Road Championships
 6th Skaidi Xtreme
 8th Flammen Liga Geels
 9th Flammen Liga Rude

2018
 National Mountain Bike Championships
1st Cross-country
1st Cross-country marathon
 National Road Championships
1st Road race
2nd Time trial
 1st National Cyclo-cross Championships
 1st FitnessDK Marathon Slagelse
 1st Blue Lagoon Challenge
 2nd Tour of Reykjavík
 4th Shimano Liga Mors
 5th Skaidi Xtreme

2019
 National Mountain Bike Championships
1st Cross-country
1st Cross-country marathon
 National Road Championships
1st Time trial
2nd Road race
 1st National Cyclo-cross Championships
 1st Blue Lagoon Challenge
 3rd The Rift
 6th Skaidi Xtreme

2020
 National Mountain Bike Championships
1st Cross-country
1st Cross-country marathon
 National Road Championships
1st Time trial
6th Road race

2021
 National Mountain Bike Championships
1st Cross-country
1st Cross-country marathon
 National Road Championships
1st Road race
2nd Time trial
 1st National Cyclo-cross Championships
 3rd UCI S1 Club La Santa 4Stage - Stage 3
 7th UCI S2 Costa Blanca Bike Race
 8th UCI C2 Trans Riviera
 2nd The Rift
 2nd Blue Lagoon Challenge

2022
 National Mountain Bike Championships
1st Cross-country
1st Cross-country marathon
 National Road Championships
1st Road race
1st Time trial
1st Criterium
 1st Cyclocross
 1st Blue Lagoon Challenge
 4th The Rift

References

External links

Omarsson, Ingvar
Omarsson, Ingvar
Icelandic male cyclists
Sportspeople from Reykjavík